Ruran (also Romanized as Rūrān) is a village in Baraan-e Jonubi Rural District, in the Central District of Isfahan County, Isfahan Province, Iran. At the 2017 census, its population was 2,103, in 648 families.

References 

Populated places in Isfahan County